The Legend of Shota Rustaveli (Georgian: "თქმულება შოთა რუსთაველზე" Tkmuleba Shota Rustavelze) is a 1904 Georgian-language opera about the 12th-century poet Shota Rustaveli by Dimitri Arakishvili; it premiered at Tbilisi Opera House in 1919.

Recordings
Aria "Madloba Gmerts" (Thanks be to God), Lado Ataneli (baritone), conducted by Lodovico Zocche
Cavatina of Queen Tamar, Anita Rachvelishvili, Orchestra Sinfonica di Torino della RAI, conducted by Giacomo Sagripanti

References

Operas set in Georgia (country)
Georgian-language operas
Operas set in the 12th century
1919 operas
Operas